Gambrill State Park is a public recreation area located on Catoctin Mountain near the city of Frederick in Frederick County, Maryland. The state park is known for the dramatic views of the surrounding area that can be seen from stone overlooks built in the 1930s by the Civilian Conservation Corps. The park is operated by the Maryland Department of Natural Resources.

Location
The park is approximately 51 miles (82 km) northwest of Washington, D.C. and 53 miles (85 km) west of Baltimore on Catoctin Mountain. Gambrill Park Road is located approximately six miles (10 km) away from Frederick on Route 40 West. The park road traverses Catoctin Mountain, and accesses the campground, the trailhead, and the High Knob areas of this park.

History
The park is named after James H. Gambrill, Jr. (1866-1951), a participant in the grain industry and in Frederick city politics, who was a conservationist and frequent visitor to Catoctin Mountain. In an effort to establish a park, Gambrill convinced his fellow businessmen to purchase the land that now makes up the park and donate it to the city of Frederick. The city then donated the land one year later to the state of Maryland. The state park was dedicated on September 7, 1934. A majority of the park's buildings and structures including its roads, stone overlooks, wooden picnic shelters, Tea Room, and ranger’s residence were constructed in the 1930s by the Civilian Conservation Corps.

Activities and amenities
The park offers trails for hikers and mountain bikers as well as a picnic area with a playground and a small fishing pond.
Trails
Each park trail is blazed with its own color scheme; each is maintained by a different volunteer group. The descriptions below are adapted from the official trail guide offered by the State of Maryland.

Overlooks

Three native stone overlooks located on the 1600-foot (490 m) summit of High Knob, midway between the Mason–Dixon line and the Potomac River, offer views of the surrounding area: north – the rugged tree-covered mountains of the Frederick City Municipal Forest; south – Crampton's Gap, a Civil War landmark and the location of Gathland State Park, as well as the Middletown and Monocacy valleys; west – South Mountain, the site of numerous Civil War engagements.

References

External links

Gambrill State Park Maryland Department of Natural Resources

Blue Ridge Mountains
Civilian Conservation Corps in Maryland
Parks in Frederick County, Maryland
State parks of Maryland
Protected areas established in 1934